Afonso Sanches, Lord of Albuquerque (1289–1329; also known as Alfonso Sanches) was a Medieval nobleman, Lord of Cerva and Alburquerque.

Biography
Born in Portugal, he was the firstborn and favorite son of King Denis of Portugal and Aldonça Rodrigues Talha. He was also the half brother of Afonso IV. Afonso was married to Teresa Martins Telo, daughter of João Afonso Telo, the first count of Barcelos, and of Teresa Sánchez, an illegitimate daughter of Sancho IV the Brave, king of Castile and León. They were the parents of João Afonso de Albuquerque. 

Afonso and his wife Teresa were the founders of the Monastery of Santa Clara in Vila do Conde where both were buried.

References

Bibliography

 
 

1289 births
1329 deaths
13th-century Portuguese people
14th-century Portuguese people
13th-century venerated Christians
14th-century venerated Christians
Portuguese Servants of God
Portuguese nobility
House of Burgundy-Portugal
People from Vila Real District